Evenk Autonomous Okrug, or Evenkia, was a federal subject of Russia (an autonomous okrug of Krasnoyarsk Krai). It had been created in 1930.  Its administrative center was the urban-type settlement of Tura.  As of 2006, at 767,600 km, it was Russia's seventh largest federal subject, and the country's least populous: 

In 1999, the governor of Krasnoyarsk, General Alexander Lebed, demanded the  recognize the central district government of Krasnoyarsk had authority over it, which the  refused to do, causing a power struggle between the central district and the 's government.

Following a referendum on the issue held on April 17, 2005, Evenk and Taymyr Autonomous Okrugs were merged into Krasnoyarsk Krai effective January 1, 2007 (some Evenks contested the results, however).  Administratively, they are now considered to be districts with special status within Krasnoyarsk Krai; municipally, they have a status of municipal districts (see Evenkiysky District).

Boris Zolotaryov was the last governor of the autonomous .

Administrative divisions

Before 2007, Evenk AO contained three districts:
 Baykitsky District
 Ilimpiyskiy District
 Tungussko-Chunsky District

Demographics

Population
(2002): 17,697.

Vital statistics
Source: Russian Federal State Statistics Service

Ethnic groups

Of the 17,697 residents (as of the 2002 census) 2 (0.01%) chose not to specify their ethnic background. Of the rest, residents identified themselves as belonging to 67 ethnic groups, including ethnic Russians (62%), Evenks (21.5%), Yakuts (5.6%), Ukrainians (3.1%), Kets (1.2%), 162 Tatars (0.9%), 152 Khakas (0.9%) and 127 Volga Germans (0.7%).

See also
Music of Evenkia

References

 
States and territories established in 1930
States and territories disestablished in 2007
Former federal subjects of Russia
Russian-speaking countries and territories